Denver Online High School is an online school that is run by the Denver Public School District. It uses the Schoology curriculum.  Forty percent of the enrolled students are gifted.

First opened in 2003, it enrolls students full time, and provides supplementary classes for students enrolled at other high schools and online classes for homeschooled families.

History 

In 2003, the first Denver Public Schools (DPS) Online High School class had six students, a principal (Jeanne Ross) and no teachers - classes were provided by Colorado Online Learning, another online school that Ross had helped start. The main office was located at CEC with the already established Distance Learning Department.

In 2004, with thirteen students, four part-time teachers were hired to develop and teach online courses. In 2005, there were four teachers, all full time, and forty-six students. In 2006, the offices moved to the old Baker school, now DCIS, and opened a satellite site at Manual High School. The first graduating class consisted of fourteen students out of 135 enrolled students in 2007.

In 2008, thirty students graduated out of over 200 students who were enrolled. In 2009 the school offices moved to Mitchell Elementary School and a satellite site was opened at Hamilton Middle School.

In 2009, thirty-two students graduated with the assistance of Denver Online High School, including six who were also enrolled at other schools and 25 who graduated directly from the school.

Campus 
Despite being a virtual school, it shares a campus with Denver Montessori School.

References 

Online schools in the United States
High schools in Denver
Public high schools in Colorado
Educational institutions established in 2003
2003 establishments in Colorado